Silvia Marchionini (born 16 July 1975 in Verbania) is an Italian politician.

She is a member of the Democratic Party and she served as mayor of the town of Cossogno from 2004 to 2014. She was elected Mayor of Verbania on 8 June 2014 and took office on 9 June. She has been re-elected for a second term at the 2019 elections.

See also
2014 Italian local elections
2019 Italian local elections
List of mayors of Verbania

References

External links
 
 

1975 births
Living people
Mayors of Verbania
People from Verbania
Democratic Party (Italy) politicians